The 1899 Iowa gubernatorial election was held on November 7, 1899. Incumbent Republican L. M. Shaw defeated Democratic nominee Frederick Edward White with 55.26% of the vote.

General election

Candidates
Major party candidates
L. M. Shaw, Republican
Frederick Edward White, Democratic 

Other candidates
Marshall W. Atwood, Prohibition
Charles Lloyd, People's 
M. J. Kremer, Socialist Labor
C. C. Heacock, United Christian

Results

References

1899
Iowa